"Best Damn Night" is the debut single by street dance group and British band Six D. It was released on 22 July 2011 as a Digital download in the United Kingdom. The song peaked to number 34 on the UK Singles Chart.

Music video
A music video to accompany the release of "Best Damn Night" and was uploaded to YouTube on May 17, 2011 at a total length of three minutes and thirty-two seconds.

Critical reception
Lewis Corner of Digital Spy gave the song a positive review stating:
"We're gonna dance 'til we can't no more/ Hands in the air 'til our arms get sore," Pierre promises over a pick 'n' mix of electronic whooshes, squiggly beeps and a toe-tapping clap-beat - the result the Hubba Bubba of bubblegum R&B. Teamed with some impressive street dance shape-throwing and 'tude-fuelled strike-a-pose moments in the accompanying music video, what's a few lost items anyway when you've got such a head-turning introduction under your belt?

Track listing

Charts

Release history

References

2011 singles
Sony Music singles
Year of song missing
Songs written by Maejor
Songs written by Muni Long
2011 songs